DXSS (97.9 FM), broadcasting as 97.9 XFM, is a radio station owned by Southern Broadcasting Network and operated by Y2H Broadcasting Network, Inc., serving as the Mindanao flagship station of XFM Philippines. Its studio and transmitter are located at the SBN compound along Broadcast Ave., Shrine Hills, Brgy. Matina Crossing, Davao City.

History
 The station began its operations in 1977 as DXSS-FM 97.9, as an affiliate of GMA Network. It aired an AOR format.
 In 1995, GMA ended its partnership with SBN and DXSS rebranded as Music Now. The station aired an Adult Top 40 format.
 In 2002, the station became as Mom's Radio 97.9. Dedicated to the mothers and mothers-to-be listeners in Davao City.
 In 2010, it rebranded as DXSS 97.9 with limited broadcast time.
 In November 2015, Mom's Radio 97.9 returned on air, this time via satellite from Manila.
 On February 25, 2018, the station went off the air (along with its provincial stations) due to financial constraints.
 In June 2022, the station returned on air after Y2H Broadcasting Network took over the entire operations and rebranded it as XFM with a news and music format. It initially served as a relay station of Tagum City-based 100.7 FM.
 On October 4, 2022, XFM Davao and XFM Tagum respectively swapped non-license assets. The former became an originating station, while the latter has been downgraded to a relay station of Davao.
 XFM Davao completed its full migration to an originating station on October 19, 2022, when the station held a grand opening of its studios and offices at the SBN compound, along Broadcast Ave., Shrine Hills, Brgy. Matina Crossing.
 In early-2023, Davao-based independent news media outlet Newsline Philippines began blocktiming the station's late night slot for their flagship web newscast Newsline Evening News.

References 

Southern Broadcasting Network
Radio stations established in 1977
Radio stations in Davao City